Rasika Joshi (12 September 1972 – 7 July 2011) was a Marathi and Hindi film actress. A Marathi theatre and Indian television actress, she was known for Maharashtrian roleplays in Bollywood films.

Personal life
Rasika was born in a Marathi Hindu Brahmin family and was married to Girish Joshi, director and actor.

Career
She began her career with a Marathi play by Lata Narvekar called Uncha Mazha Zoka, starring Avinash Masurekar and Smita Talvalkar. Her last movie was Ram Gopal Verma's movie Not a Love Story. She worked as writer, director and actor in the play White Lily And Night Rider.

Filmography

Hindi
She was first noticed and applauded in Ek Hasina Thi. She became quite a favourite of RGV and Priyadarshan. Some of her Hindi movies include:
Gayab (2004)
Ek Hasina Thi (2004)
Vaastu Shastra (2004)
Darna Zaroori Hai (2006)
Malamaal Weekly (2006)
Darling (2007)
Johnny Gaddaar (2007)
Dhol (2007)
Bhool Bhulaiyaa (2007)
De Taali (2008)
Billu (2009)
Not a Love Story (2011)

Television 
She became a household name with the Marathi serials Prapanch, Ghadlay Bighadlay, Bua Alaa and Yeh Duniya Hai Rangeen (1999). Her performance as Tarulata in Bandini was much appreciated.

Marathi
Rasika Joshi was a talented actress who worked in many films, theatre as well as television serials. Jabardast and Khabardaar are some of her notable works. T.V. shows like Ghadlay Bighadlay and Prapanch made her popular. She has also authored the Marathi movie Yanda Kartavya Aahe. Her self written, directed, essayed play, White Lily & Night Rider along with Milind Phatak won many awards, praises as well as accolades.

Death
She died from leukaemia on 7 July 2011 in a nursing home in Mumbai, aged 38, and was survived by her husband Girish Joshi and family.

References

Indian film actresses
Actresses in Marathi cinema
Actresses in Hindi cinema
Indian television actresses
Actresses from Mumbai
Deaths from cancer in India
Deaths from leukemia
2011 deaths
1972 births
Actresses in Marathi television
20th-century Indian actresses
21st-century Indian actresses